Thomas McLean Jr. (born 2 June 1947 in Larkhall) is a Scottish former professional football player and manager. McLean played for Kilmarnock, Rangers and Scotland as a midfielder. He managed Morton, Motherwell, Hearts, Raith Rovers and Dundee United.

Early life
McLean grew up in Ashgill, Lanarkshire, along with his elder brothers Jim and Willie, who would also become successful players and managers.

Playing career
A traditional tricky winger, McLean started his career at Kilmarnock, where at one point all three brothers were at the club together, Jim and Tommy as players and Willie as a coach. He was part of the Kilmarnock team which won the club's only league title, in 1964-65.

He joined Rangers in 1971 for £65,000 and was involved in the clubs famous 1972 Cup Winners Cup triumph. He went on to play 452 times for Rangers, winning three League championships, four Scottish Cups and three Scottish League Cups.

McLean made nine appearances for Scotland, all of them during his time with Kilmarnock. Three of those games were during a 1967 overseas tour that the Scottish Football Association decided in October 2021 to reclassify as full internationals, which increased McLean's cap tally from six to nine. He also represented the Scottish League XI seven times.

He was selected for the Scotland under-18s at the 1963 UEFA under-18 Euros in England.

In October 2016 he was inducted into the Kilmarnock 'Hall of Fame' alongside other well-known former players such as James Fowler, Ray Montgomerie and Stuart McLean (no relation).

Managerial career
After his playing career he became Rangers' assistant manager. Thereafter he had spells in management with Morton, Motherwell, Hearts, Raith Rovers and Dundee United, before becoming Under-19 coach at Rangers.

McLean managed Motherwell for ten years, during which the club won the Scottish Cup in 1991. Motherwell defeated Dundee United, who were managed by his brother Jim, in the cup final to enter Europe for the first time in their history. They also challenged for the 1993–94 Scottish Premier Division title, eventually finishing third.

His spell at Raith Rovers in 1996 was remarkable for lasting only six days and encompassing only one game; the lure of working under Jim, by then chairman of Dundee United, saw him quit Stark's Park for Tannadice amidst substantial acrimony.

McLean returned to Rangers in May 2001 as director of youth development, after he had held a similar post at Dundee United since October 2000.

On 4 November 2021, it was announced that McLean was to be inducted into the Motherwell F.C. Hall of Fame. A week later, following consultations with supporter groups, the south stand at Fir Park was re-named in his honour.

Tommy is married to wife Beth. Their daughter Lorna was born in 1991.

Honours

Player
Kilmarnock
Scottish league champions (1): 1964–65 
Rangers
Scottish league champions (3): 1974–75, 1975–76, 1977–78
Scottish Cup (4): 1972–73, 1975–76, 1977–78, 1978–79
Scottish League Cup (3): 1975–76, 1977–78, 1978–79
European Cup Winners' Cup (1): 1971–72

Manager
 Morton
 Scottish First Division: 1983–84

Motherwell
Scottish Cup (1): 1990–91
 Scottish First Division (1): 1984–85

Individual
Scottish Football Hall of Fame inductee: 2019
Motherwell Hall of Fame: 2022

References

External links

Rangers Hall of Fame profile
 

1947 births
Living people
Scottish footballers
Scotland international footballers
Kilmarnock F.C. players
Rangers F.C. players
Scottish football managers
Greenock Morton F.C. managers
Motherwell F.C. managers
Heart of Midlothian F.C. managers
Raith Rovers F.C. managers
Dundee United F.C. managers
Rangers F.C. non-playing staff
Greenock Morton F.C. non-playing staff
Sportspeople from Larkhall
Scottish Premier League managers
Scottish Football League players
Scottish Football League representative players
Scottish Football League managers
Association football wingers
Footballers from South Lanarkshire
Scotland under-23 international footballers
Scottish Football Hall of Fame inductees